Polače  is a village in Croatia. It is connected by the D120 highway.

References

Populated places in Dubrovnik-Neretva County
Mljet